The 2017 Kentucky Wildcats football team represented the University of Kentucky in the 2017 NCAA Division I FBS football season. The Wildcats played their home games at Kroger Field in Lexington, Kentucky. Kentucky played as a member of the Eastern Division of the Southeastern Conference. They were led by fifth-year head coach Mark Stoops. They finished the season 7–6, 4–4 in SEC play to finish in a tie for third place in the Eastern Division. They were invited to the Music City Bowl where they lost to Northwestern.

Previous season
In 2016, the Wildcats won seven out of their last ten games after starting the season 0–2, completing their fourth year under Mark Stoops at 7–5 and 4–4 in the SEC (3rd-East). They defeated in-state rival and ninth-ranked Louisville, 41–38, to end the regular season. In the postseason, the Wildcats competed in the TaxSlayer Bowl, losing to Georgia Tech 18–33.

Offseason

Spring Game
The spring game took place on April 14, in Lexington.

Departures

2017 signing class

Prior to National Signing Day on February 1, 2017, seven players enrolled for the spring semester in order to participate in spring practice and included six former high school seniors and one junior college transfer. On National Signing Day, Kentucky signed an additional seventeen players out of high school and junior college that completed the 2017 recruiting class.

Personnel

Coaching staff
Kentucky head coach Mark Stoops enters his fifth season as the Wildcat's head coach for the 2017 season.  During his previous four seasons he led the Wildcats to an overall record of 19 wins and 30 losses.

On January 18, 2017 Defensive Coordinator D.J. Eliot announced he would not return to the program for the 2017 season as the defensive coordinator to instead continue his career at Colorado.  In his place Kentucky promoted special teams coordinator Matt House as Defensive Coordinator at Kentucky.

Roster

Schedule and results
The Wildcats' 2017 schedule consisted of seven home games and five away games. Kentucky hosted three of its four non-conference games—against Eastern Kentucky from the Ohio Valley Conference, Eastern Michigan from the Mid-American Conference, and Louisville from the ACC. They traveled to Southern Miss for their only road non-conference game. The Wildcats played eight conference games, hosting Florida, Missouri, Tennessee, and Ole Miss and traveling to South Carolina, Mississippi State, Vanderbilt, and Georgia.

Schedule Source:

Game summaries

at Southern Miss

Eastern Kentucky

at South Carolina

#20 Florida

Eastern Michigan

Missouri

at Mississippi State

Tennessee

Ole Miss

at Vanderbilt

at #7 Georgia

Louisville

#23 Northwestern–Music City Bowl

Awards and milestones

SEC honors

All-SEC First Team
 Benny Snell, RB (AP)

All-SEC Second Team
 Josh Allen, LB (AP)
 Benny Snell, RB (coaches)

Freshman All-SEC
 Lynn Bowden, RS

School records
 Most touchdowns scored in a season: 18, Benny Snell (ongoing)
 Most rushing touchdowns in a season: 18, Benny Snell (ongoing)
 Most career rushing touchdowns: 31, Benny Snell (ongoing)
 Most points scored in a season: 110, Benny Snell (ongoing)
 Most career points scored: 354, Austin MacGinnis (ongoing)
 Most field goals in a season: 21, Austin MacGinnis (ongoing; ties own record from 2016)
 Most career field goals: 71, Austin MacGinnis (ongoing)

National awards and honors
 Wuerffel Trophy — Courtney Love

References

Kentucky
Kentucky Wildcats football seasons
Kentucky Wildcats football